The Corine – International Book Prize, as it is officially called, is a German literature prize created by the 
Bavarian chapter of the Börsenverein des Deutschen Buchhandels, first awarded in 2001. It is awarded to German and international "authors for excellent literary achievements and their recognition by the public."

The award announced on its website that it would take a break for 2012 and relaunch in 2013, but has not returned .

Trophy 
The "Corine" trophy is a figurine produced by the Nymphenburg Porcelain Manufactory. "Corine" was first manufactured in 1760 as part of a sixteen-figure set of commedia dell'arte performers in porcelain, designed by the German modeller Franz Anton Bustelli (1723–1763).

Winners

2001 
 Fiction: Zeruya Shalev for Mann und Frau
 Fiction: Henning Mankell for One Step Behind
 Non-fiction: Pascale N. Bercovitch for Das Lächeln des Delphins
 Non-fiction: Simon Singh for The Code Book
 Illustrated Non-fiction: The Beatles for The Beatles Anthology
 Children's Book: Joanne K. Rowling for Harry Potter and the Goblet of Fire
 Prize of Honour from the Bavarian Minister-President: Wolf Jobst Siedler for Ein Leben wird besichtigt
 Rolf Heyne First Book Prize: Manil Suri for The Death of Vishnu
 Weltbild Readers' Prize: Rosamunde Pilcher for Winter Solstice

2002
 Fiction: Paulo Coelho for The Alchemist
 Non-fiction: Waris Dirie for Desert Flower
 Illustrated Non-fiction: Jacques Perrin for Nomaden der Lüfte – Das Geheimnis der Zugvögel
 Children's Book: Astrid Lindgren posthumously, for life's work
 HypoVereinsbank Business Book Award: Prof. Meinhard Miegel for Die deformierte Gesellschaft. Wie die Deutschen ihre Wirklichkeit verdrängen
 Rolf Heyne First Book Prize: Sven Regener for Herr Lehmann
 Prize of Honour from the Bavarian Minister-President: Siegfried Lenz for his life's work
 Weltbild Readers' Prize: Barbara Wood for Sacred Ground

2003
 Fiction: Donna Leon, Wilful Behaviour 
 Non-fiction: Inge and Walter Jens, Frau Thomas Mann
 Illustrated Non-fiction: Nina Hagen / Marcel Feige, That's Why The Lady Is A Punk  
 Children's Book: Cornelia Funke, The Thief Lord
 HypoVereinsbank Business Book Award: Hans-Olaf Henkel, Die Ethik des Erfolgs  
 Rolf Heyne First Book Prize: Jonathan Safran Foer, Everything Is Illuminated
 Prize of Honour from the Bavarian Minister-President: Nadine Gordimer for her life's work 
 Weltbild Readers' Prize: Ken Follett, Jackdaws

2004
 Fiction: Frank Schätzing, The Swarm
 Non-fiction: Frank Schirrmacher, Das Methusalem-Komplott
 Children's Book: Ulrich Janßen, Ulla Steuernagel, Die Kinder-Uni
 Rolf Heyne First Book Prize: Louise Welsh, The Cutting Room
 Economics Book: Hans-Werner Sinn, Ist Deutschland noch zu retten?
 Audiobook: Schönherz & Fleer, Rilke Projekt, 1 bis 3
 Prize of Honour from the Bavarian Minister-President: Imre Kertész for his life's work
 Weltbild Readers' Prize: Patricia Shaw, The Five Winds
 Future Prize: Tad Williams, Otherland

2005
 Fiction: Per Olov Enquist, Das Buch von Blanche und Marie
 Non-fiction: Claus Kleber, Amerikas Kreuzzüge
 Children's Book: Kai Meyer, Frostfeuer
 Rolf Heyne First Book Prize: Eva Menasse, Vienna
 Economics Book: Jeremy Rifkin, The European Dream: How Europe's Vision of the Future Is Quietly Eclipsing the American Dream
 Prize of Honour from the Bavarian Minister-President: Walter Kempowski for his life's work
 Weltbild Readers' Prize: Cecelia Ahern, Für immer vielleicht
 Audiobook: Helma Sanders-Brahms, Tausendundeine Nacht
 Future Prize: Kurt G. Blüchel, Bionik

2006
 Fiction: Kazuo Ishiguro, Never Let Me Go
 Non-fiction: Neclà Kelek, Die verlorenen Söhne. Plädoyer für die Befreiung des türkisch-muslimischen Mannes
 Children's Book: Jonathan Stroud, Bartimäus. Die Pforte des Magiers
 Rolf Heyne First Book Prize: Bertina Henrichs, Die Schachspielerin
 Economics Book: Kurt Biedenkopf, Die Ausbeutung der Enkel
 Prize of Honour from the Bavarian Minister-President: Amos Oz for his life's work
 Weltbild Readers' Prize: Diana Gabaldon, Ein Hauch von Schnee und Asche
 Audiobook: Klaus Maria Brandauer und Birgit Minichmayr, Brandauer liest Mozart
 Future Prize: Tim Flannery, Wir Wettermacher

2007
 Fiction: Wilhelm Genazino, Mittelmäßiges Heimweh
 Non-fiction: Anne Siemens, Für die RAF war er das System, für mich der Vater - die andere Geschichte des deutschen Terrorismus
 Children's Book: Sergej Lukianenko, Das Schlangenschwert
 Rolf Heyne First Book Prize: Harald Martenstein, Heimweg
 Economics Book: Érik Orsenna, Weiße Plantagen – eine Reise durch unsere globalisierte Welt
 Prize of Honour from the Bavarian Minister-President: Peter Härtling for his life's work
 Weltbild Readers' Prize: Andrea Maria Schenkel (Author) and Monica Bleibtreu (Reader) for the book and audiobook Tannöd
 Audiobook: Hape Kerkeling, Ein Mann, ein Fjord

2008
 Fiction: Feridun Zaimoglu, Liebesbrand
 Non-fiction: Manfred Lütz, Gott. Eine kleine Geschichte des Größten
 Children's Book: Andreas Steinhöfel, Rico, Oskar und die Tieferschatten
 Bilderwelten: Nadine Barth (Hrsg.), Verschwindende Landschaften
 Economics Book: Paul Collier, The Bottom Billion
 Prize of Honour from the Bavarian Minister-President: Martin Walser for his life's work
 Future Prize: Muhammad Yunus, Die Armut besiegen
 Weltbild Readers' Prize: Volker Klüpfel, Michael Kobr, Laienspiel. Kluftingers neuer Fall
 Audiobook: Henning Mankell, [[The Man from Beijing (novel)|The Man from Beijing]] (read by Axel Milberg)
 2009
 Fiction: Mohammed Hanif, A Case of Exploding Mangoes Non-fiction: Richard von Weizsäcker, Der Weg zur Einheit Children's Book: Mirjam Pressler, Nathan und seine Kinder Bilderwelten: Alex MacLean, OVER: The American Landscape at the Tipping Point Economics Book: Reinhard Marx, Das Kapital. Ein Plädoyer für den Menschen Future Prize: Nicholas Stern, Der Global Deal Audiobook: Fred Vargas, Der verbotene Ort (gelesen von Barbara Nüsse)
 Prize of Honour from the Bavarian Minister-President: Rüdiger Safranski for his life's work
 2010
 Fiction: Hans Joachim Schädlich, Kokoschkins Reise Audience Award: Carla Federico, Im Land der Feuerblume Young Adult Novel: John Green, Paper Towns Bilderwelten: Herlinde Koelbl, Mein Blick Economics Book: Wolfgang Kersting, Verteidigung des Liberalismus Future Prize: William Kamkwamba, Bryan Mealer, The Boy Who Harnessed the Wind: Creating Currents of Electricity and Hope Audiobook: Jo Nesbø, The Leopard (gelesen von Burkhart Klaußner)
 Prize of Honour from the Bavarian Minister-President: Herbert Rosendorfer for his life's work
 2011
 Zeit Publishing Literature Award: John Burnside, A Lie About My Father Klassic Radio Audience Award: Juliane Koepcke, When I fell from the Sky Young Readers’ Award: Kate de Goldi, The 10 PM Question Bilderwelten: Elke Heidenreich, Tom Krausz, Dylan Thomas Business Book Award: Peter D. Schiff, Andrew J. Schiff, How an Economy Grows and Why it Crashes Future Prize: António Damásio, Self Comes to Mind : Constructing the Conscious Brain Audiobook: Axel Hacke, Ursula Mauder, The Best of My Love Life''
 Prize of Honour from the Bavarian Minister-President: Christine Nöstlinger for her life's work

References

External links 
 Corine Internationaler Buchpreis (Selbstdarstellung)
 Landesverband Bayern zur Corine

Awards established in 2001
German non-fiction literary awards
First book awards
Fiction awards
2001 establishments in Germany